At least four ships of the Royal Navy have borne the name HMS Mentor:

 was an armed ship of unknown name and 24-guns that the British Royal Navy captured from the Americans in 1778, and that purchasers converted to the Liverpool privateer Who's Afraid. Sir Peter Parker purchased her at Jamaica in 1780 and renamed her HMS Mentor; she was burnt in 1781 during the Siege of Pensacola to prevent the Spanish from capturing her.
 was an  launched in 1914. She served on the First Ostend Raid and the Battle of Dogger Bank (1915); she was broken up in 1922.
 was a tender, sold in 1992.

During World War II, the Ministry of Defence took over Lews Castle as accommodation for the air and ground crew of 700 Naval Air Squadron. The squadron operated a detachment of six Supermarine Walrus aircraft from a slipway at Cuddy Point in the Grounds. The base was referred to as HMS Mentor.

Hired armed vessels
 From 1794 to 1798, the Admiralty employed the armed ship Mentor. 
 From 1793 to 1801 the Admiralty employed the hired armed vessel , a snow launched in 1792, of 193 tons (bm), armed with ten 4-pounder guns.

Citations and references
Citations

References
Owsley, Frank L. Jr. (July 1983) Review of: The Log of H.M.S. Mentor, 1780-1781, a New Account of the British Navy at Pensacola by James A. Servies. Florida Historical Quarterly, Vol. 62, No. 1, pp. 82–4.
McCarthy, Kevin M. & William L. Trotter (1992) Thirty Florida Shipwrecks. (Pineapple Press).   

  

Royal Navy ship names